The CF postcode area, also known as the Cardiff postcode area, is a group of 35 postcode districts for post towns: Cardiff, Bridgend, Merthyr Tydfil, Caerphilly, Aberdare, Bargoed, Barry, Cowbridge, Dinas Powys, Ferndale, Hengoed, Llantwit Major, Maesteg, Mountain Ash, Penarth, Pentre, Pontyclun, Pontypridd, Porth, Porthcawl, Rhoose, Sully, Tonypandy, Treharris and Treorchy in south Wales. The CF postcode area is one of six with a population above 1 million.



Coverage
The approximate coverage of the postcode districts:

|-
! CF3
| CARDIFF
| CARDIFF SOUTH (East):Rumney & Trowbridge, Llanrumney, St MellonsNEWPORT WEST:Castleton, Marshfield
| Cardiff, Newport
|-
! CF5
| CARDIFF
| CARDIFF WEST (South):Ely, Caerau, St Fagans, Culverhouse Cross, Canton & Leckwith, Fairwater, Danescourt, Llandaff, RiversideVALE OF GLAMORGAN:Wenvoe, Peterston Super Ely, St Georges super Ely, Michaelston-le-Pit, Michaelston-super-Ely
| Cardiff, Vale of Glamorgan 
|-
! CF10
| CARDIFF
| CARDIFF CENTRAL / CARDIFF SOUTH:CARDIFF CITY CENTRE (part of), Grangetown, CARDIFF BAY (part of) & Butetown
| Cardiff 
|-
! CF11
| CARDIFF
| CARDIFF CENTRAL / CARDIFF SOUTH:CARDIFF CITY CENTRE (part of), Canton, CARDIFF BAY (part of), Grangetown
| Cardiff 
|-
! CF14
| CARDIFF
| CARDIFF NORTH (West):Birchgrove, Whitchurch, Thornhill & Lisvane, Rhiwbina & Pantmawr, Gabalfa, Heath, Llandaff North, Llanishen
| Cardiff 
|-
! CF15
| CARDIFF
| CARDIFF WEST (North):Pentyrch & Gwaelod-y-Garth & Creigiau, Radyr & Morganstown, TongwynlaisRHONDDA CYNON TAFF:Taffs Well & NantgarwCAERPHILLY:Groeswen
| Cardiff, Rhondda Cynon Taf, Caerphilly 
|-
! CF23
| CARDIFF
| CARDIFF NORTH (East):Llanishen, Cyncoed, Pentwyn, Penylan, Pontprennau & Old St Mellons
| Cardiff 
|-
! CF24
| CARDIFF
| CARDIFF CENTRAL:CARDIFF CITY CENTRE (part of) & Cathays, Roath & Plasnewydd, Splott, Adamsdown
| Cardiff 
|-
! style="background:#FFFFFF;"|CF30
| style="background:#FFFFFF;"|CARDIFF
| style="background:#FFFFFF;"|
| style="background:#FFFFFF;"|non-geographic
|-
! CF31
| BRIDGEND
| Bridgend, Brackla, Coity, Pen-y-fai
| Bridgend 
|-
! CF32
| BRIDGEND
| BRIDGEND:Cefn Cribwr, Laleston, Merthyr Mawr, Ogmore Vale, Tondu, Sarn, Ynysawdre, St Bride's Minor, Pontycymer, Llangeinor, Garw Valley, Blaengarw, Blackmill, Bettws, AberkenfigVALE OF GLAMORGAN:St Brides Major
| Bridgend, Vale of Glamorgan
|-
! CF33
| BRIDGEND
| Cornelly, Pyle
| Bridgend
|-
! CF34
| MAESTEG
| Maesteg, Llangynwyd, Caerau, Nantyffyllon
| Bridgend
|-
! CF35
| BRIDGEND
| BRIDGEND:PENCOED TOWN, Coychurch, LlanganVALE OF GLAMORGAN:Ewenny
| Bridgend, Vale of Glamorgan
|-
! CF36
| PORTHCAWL
| Porthcawl, Nottage, Newton
| Bridgend 
|-
! CF37
| PONTYPRIDD
| Pontypridd Community:PONTYPRIDD TOWN including Cilfynydd, Glyncoch, Graig, Treforest, Hopkinstown, Trallwng, Maesycoed, Pwllgwaun, Hawthorn, Rhydfelen, TREHAFODYnysybwl Community:YNYSYBWL & Coed-y-Cwm
| Rhondda Cynon Taf 
|-
! CF38
| PONTYPRIDD
| Llantwit Fardre Community:LLANTWIT FARDRE, CHURCH VILLAGE, Tonteg, Efail IsafLlantrisant Community (part of):BEDDAU & Ty Nant
| Rhondda Cynon Taf 
|-
! CF39
| PORTH
| Rhondda Area (RCT):PORTH TOWN & Llwyncelyn, CYMMER & Glynfach & Trebanog, YNYSHIR & Wattstown, Dinas (part of)Taff-Ely Area (RCT):TONYREFAIL TOWN & Coed-Ely & Thomastown, GILFACH GOCHBRIDGEND: Evanstown 
| Rhondda Cynon Taf, Bridgend
|-
! CF40
| TONYPANDY
| Rhondda Area:TONYPANDY TOWN, TREALAW, PENYGRAIG, Dinas (part of), Williamstown, Cwm Clydach, LLWYNYPIATaff-Ely Area:Penrhiwfer
| Rhondda Cynon Taf
|-
! CF41
| PENTRE
| Pentre, Ton Pentre, Ystrad, Gelli
| Rhondda Cynon Taf
|-
! CF42
| TREORCHY
| Treorchy, Cwmparc, Ynyswen, Treherbert, Blaencwm, Blaenrhondda
| Rhondda Cynon Taf 
|-
! CF43
| FERNDALE
| Ferndale, Blaenllechau, Tylorstown, Penrhys, Pontygwaith, Stanleytown, Maerdy
| Rhondda Cynon Taf 
|-
! CF44
| ABERDARE
| Aberdare, Cwmaman, Aberaman, Llwydcoed, Cwmbach, Hirwaun, Penywaun, Rhigos, Penderyn, Ystradfellte
| Rhondda Cynon Taf, Powys 
|-
! CF45
| MOUNTAIN ASH
| Mountain Ash, Abercynon, Penrhiwceiber, Ynysboeth
| Rhondda Cynon Taf 
|-
! CF46
| TREHARRIS
| Treharris, Quakers Yard, Bedlinog, Nelson
| Merthyr Tydfil, Caerphilly
|-
! CF47
| MERTHYR TYDFIL
| Merthyr Tydfil, Gurnos, Penydarren
| Merthyr Tydfil 
|-
! CF48
| MERTHYR TYDFIL
| Cyfarthfa, Pant, Merthyr Vale, Troed-y-rhiw, Vaynor, Pentrebach
| Merthyr Tydfil, Powys 
|-
! CF61
| LLANTWIT MAJOR
| Llantwit Major, Llan-maes
| Vale of Glamorgan
|-
! CF62
| BARRY
| Barry (west), Rhoose, St Athan, Llancarfan, Barry Island
| Vale of Glamorgan 
|-
! CF63
| BARRY
| Barry (east), Cadoxton, Barry Docks
| Vale of Glamorgan 
|-
! CF64
| PENARTH; DINAS POWYS
| Penarth, Dinas Powys, Sully, Llandough
| Vale of Glamorgan 
|-
! CF71
| COWBRIDGE
| Cowbridge, St Brides Major, Welsh St Donats, Pendoylan, Llandow, Colwinston, Llanblethian, Penllyn, Llanfair
| Vale of Glamorgan 
|-
! CF72
| PONTYCLUN
| Pontyclun, Llantrisant, Llanharan, Talbot Green, Brynsadler, Miskin, Brynna, Llanharry
| Rhondda Cynon Taf
|-
! CF81
| BARGOED
| Bargoed, Aberbargoed, Darran Valley, Gilfach, Pontlottyn
| Caerphilly
|-
! CF82
| HENGOED
| Hengoed, Cefn Hengoed, Ystrad Mynach, Gelligaer, Maesycwmmer
| Caerphilly
|-
! CF83
| CAERPHILLY
| Caerphilly, Abertridwr, Senghenydd, Bedwas, Trethomas, Machen, Llanbradach, Pwllypant, Penyrheol, Energlyn, Trecenydd, Rudry
| Caerphilly
|-
! style="background:#FFFFFF;"|CF91
| style="background:#FFFFFF;"|CARDIFF
| style="background:#FFFFFF;"|
| style="background:#FFFFFF;"|non-geographic
|-
! style="background:#FFFFFF;"|CF95
| style="background:#FFFFFF;"|CARDIFF
| style="background:#FFFFFF;"|
| style="background:#FFFFFF;"|non-geographic
|-
! style="background:#FFFFFF;"|CF99
| style="background:#FFFFFF;"|CARDIFF
| style="background:#FFFFFF;"|
| style="background:#FFFFFF;"|non-geographic
|}

Map

See also
List of postcode areas in the United Kingdom
Cardiff Mail Centre
Postcode Address File

References

External links
Using Welsh alternative addresses within Royal Mail's Postcode Address File (PAF)
Royal Mail's Postcode Address File
A quick introduction to Royal Mail's Postcode Address File (PAF)

Postcode areas covering Wales